Carolina Main is an English actress known for her TV roles as DC Fran Lingley on the ITV crime drama series Unforgotten (2017-present) and as Cat Hogan  on the Channel 5 and  Virgin Media drama series Blood (2018–present)

Filmography

References

External links
 
 

Living people
21st-century English actresses
English film actresses
English stage actresses
English television actresses
Year of birth missing (living people)